The following lists the top 100 albums of 1997  in Australia from the Australian Recording Industry Association (ARIA) End of Year Albums Chart.

Peak chart positions from 1997 are from the ARIA Charts, overall position on the End of Year Chart is calculated by ARIA based on the number of weeks and position that the records reach within the Top 50 albums for each week during 1997.

Notes

References

Australian record charts
1997 in Australian music
1997 record charts